SS Sud America was an Italian ocean liner. She was built by Wigham Richardson, in Newcastle upon Tyne, England, and launched in 1872. She was operated by Lavarello Fratelli Fu G. B from 1872 until 1883. Her second owner was another Italian shipping company, La Veloce Navigazione Italiana a Vapore S. A., from 1884, who renamed her SS Sud America I.

Sinking
On 13 September 1888, the ship was transporting from 260 passengers and 69 crew from Buenos Aires, Argentina, to Genoa, Italy, via Las Palmas, Gran Canaria in the Canary Islands. The ship was also carrying 700 tonnes of cargo. The ship was docked in the bay and the passengers were disembarking, while preparations were made for anchoring in order to load coal in the bay at Las Palmas. Seventy nine of the 329 passengers and crew died in the disaster.

References

Maritime incidents in Spain
Maritime incidents in September 1888
Shipwrecks of Spain
Shipwrecks in the Atlantic Ocean
1872 ships
Ships built on the River Tyne
Steamships of Italy